Frigyes Hollósi (18 February 1906 – 15 January 1979), also known as Hollósi-Jung, was a Hungarian swimmer and rower. He competed in the men's 200 metre breaststroke event at the 1924 Summer Olympics. He also competed in the men's coxed eight in rowing at the 1936 Summer Olympics.

References

External links
 

1906 births
1979 deaths
Hungarian male swimmers
Hungarian male rowers
Olympic swimmers of Hungary
Olympic rowers of Hungary
Swimmers at the 1924 Summer Olympics
Rowers at the 1936 Summer Olympics
People from Nagymaros
European Rowing Championships medalists
Male breaststroke swimmers
Sportspeople from Pest County
20th-century Hungarian people